State Road 10 (SR 10), also known as Atlantic Boulevard, is a major east–west state highway in the U.S. state of Florida. Mostly unsigned in favor of U.S. Highway 90, it runs from the Alabama state line (Perdido River) to Atlantic Beach. The only sections that are not signed as US 90 are north of Pensacola, where US 90 uses SR 10A and SR 10 is signed as U.S. Highway 90 Alternate, and east of south Jacksonville, where US 90 uses unsigned SR 212.

Route description
The only signed section of SR 10 is in Jacksonville and Atlantic Beach. Signage begins at the interchange with Interstate 95 and U.S. Highway 1, where US 1 splits to the south. There is a signed concurrency east to the split with US 90. Where US 90 and SR 10 split, SR 10 is known as Atlantic Boulevard, while US 90 is known as Beach Boulevard (unsigned State Road 212) to Jacksonville Beach.

About a mile (2 km) before the east end of SR 10, at the east end of the bridge over the Intracoastal Waterway, SR A1A (Mayport Road) joins from the north. There is an incorrect overhead sign that says the Mayport Road flyover ramp is SR 101, however the SR 101 designation does not begin on Mayport Road for another 2.3 miles (3.6 km).  At the exit, Mayport Road is SR A1A.  The two roads run concurrently on Atlantic Boulevard to Third Street, where SR 10 ends and SR A1A turns south. (Atlantic Boulevard continues several blocks further as a local road to the beach.)

Major intersections

References

External links

010
010
010
010
010
010
010
010
010
010
010
010
010
010
010
010
010
010
1945 establishments in Florida